Pasión dominguera is a 1970 Argentine film; B qualified was, not commercially premiered being exhibited as a complement in neighborhood theaters.

Cast
Jorge Porcel, Luis Tasca, Fidel Pintos, Nathán Pinzón, Perla Caron, Federico Luppi, Beto Gianola, Néstor Fabián, Juan Carlos de Seta, Gloria Leyland, Beatriz Bonnet, Manuel de Sabattini, Vicente Ariño, Roberto Galán, Héctor Sturman, Ramón "Palito" Ortega, Fernando Iglesias “Tacholas”, Jorge Salcedo, Marty Cosens, Oscar “Ringo” Bonavena.

External links
 

1970 films
Argentine sports comedy films
1970s Spanish-language films
1970s Argentine films